Naïma Ababsa (1963 – 18 April 2021) was an Algerian singer.

Biography
Ababsa was the daughter of the composer . Her sister, Fella El Djazairia, is also a singer. She performed a great range of musical material and genres, such as Chaoui, Algérois, and other styles from North Africa. She paid tribute to Lounès Matoub in 2000 onstage in Paris. She also paid homage to the singer Seloua at the Théâtre national algérien Mahieddine-Bachtarzi in Algiers in 2008. That same year, she participated in the 8th annual Festival Orientalys in Montreal.

Naïma Ababsa died in Algiers on 18 April 2021, at the age of 58.

Albums
Ya khti (2010)
La Star Du Chaoui (2017)

References

External links
 

1963 births
2021 deaths
20th-century Algerian women singers
People from Tlemcen
21st-century Algerian women singers
Deaths from the COVID-19 pandemic in Algeria